, known by his pen name , was a Japanese novelist and author. A number of his most popular works, such as The Setting Sun (Shayō) and No Longer Human (Ningen Shikkaku), are considered modern-day classics.

His influences include Ryūnosuke Akutagawa, Murasaki Shikibu and Fyodor Dostoyevsky. While Dazai continues to be widely celebrated in Japan, he remains relatively unknown elsewhere, with only a handful of his works available in English. His last book, No Longer Human, is his most popular work outside of Japan.

Early life

Shūji Tsushima was born on June 19, 1909, the eighth surviving child of a wealthy landowner and politician in Kanagi, a remote corner of Japan at the northern tip of Tōhoku in Aomori Prefecture. He was the tenth of eleven children by his parents. At the time of his birth, the huge, newly-completed Tsushima mansion, where he would spend his early years, was home to some thirty family members. The Tsushima family was of obscure peasant origins, with Dazai's great-grandfather building up the family's wealth as a moneylender, and his son increasing it further. They quickly rose in power and, after some time, became highly respected across the region.

Dazai's father, Gen'emon, a younger son of the Matsuki family, which due to "its exceedingly 'feudal' tradition" had no use for sons other than the eldest son and heir, was adopted into the Tsushima family to marry the eldest daughter, Tane; he became involved in politics due to his position as one of the four wealthiest landowners in the prefecture, and was offered membership into the House of Peers. This made Dazai's father absent during much of his early childhood, and with his mother, Tane, being ill, Tsushima was brought up mostly by the family's servants and his aunt Kiye.

Education and literary beginnings

In 1916, Tsushima began his education at Kanagi Elementary. On March 4, 1923, Tsushima's father Gen'emon died from lung cancer, and then a month later in April Tsushima attended Hirosaki High School, followed by entering Hirosaki University's literature department in 1927. He developed an interest in Edo culture and began studying gidayū, a form of chanted narration used in the puppet theaters. Around 1928, Tsushima edited a series of student publications and contributed some of his own works. He also published a magazine called Saibō bungei (Cell Literature) with his friends, and subsequently became a staff member of the college's newspaper.

Tsushima's success in writing was brought to a halt when his idol, the writer Ryūnosuke Akutagawa, committed suicide in 1927 at 35 years old. Tsushima started to neglect his studies, and spent the majority of his allowance on clothes, alcohol, and prostitutes. He also dabbled with Marxism, which at the time was heavily suppressed by the government. On the night of December 10, 1929, Tsushima committed his first suicide attempt, but survived and was able to graduate the following year. In 1930, Tsushima enrolled in the French Literature Department of Tokyo Imperial University and promptly stopped studying again. In October, he ran away with a geisha named  and was formally disowned by his family.

Nine days after being expelled from Tokyo Imperial University, Tsushima attempted suicide by drowning off a beach in Kamakura with another woman, 19-year-old bar hostess . Tanabe died, but Tsushima lived, rescued by a fishing boat and was charged as an accomplice in Tanabe's death. Shocked by the events, Tsushima's family intervened to drop a police investigation. His allowance was reinstated, and he was released of any charges. In December, Tsushima recovered at Ikarigaseki and married Hatsuyo there.

Soon after, Tsushima was arrested for his involvement with the banned Japanese Communist Party and, upon learning this, his elder brother Bunji promptly cut off his allowance again. Tsushima went into hiding, but Bunji, despite their estrangement, managed to get word to him that charges would be dropped and the allowance reinstated yet again if Tsushima solemnly promised to graduate and swear off any involvement with the party. Tsushima accepted.

Leftist movement
In 1929, when its principal's misappropriation of public funds was discovered at Hirosaki High School, the students, under the leadership of Ueda Shigehiko (Ishigami Genichiro), leader of the Social Science Study Group, staged a five-day allied strike, which resulted in the principal's resignation and no disciplinary action against the students. Tsushima hardly participated in the strike, but in imitation of the proletarian literature in vogue at the time, he summarized the incident in a novel called Student Group and read it to Ueda. The Tsushima family was wary of Dazai's leftist activities. On January 16 of the following year, the Special High Police arrested Ueda and nine other students of the Hiroko Institute of Social Studies, who were working as terminal activists for Seigen Tanaka's armed Communist Party.

In college, Dazai met activist Eizo Kudo, and made a monthly financial contribution of ¥10 to the Communist Party. The reason why he was expelled from his family after his marriage with Hatsuyo Oyama was to prevent the accumulation of illegal activities on Bunji, who was a politician. After his marriage, Dazai was ordered to hide his sympathies and moved repeatedly. In July 1932, Bunji tracked him down, and had him turn himself in at the Aomori Police Station. In December, Dazai signed and sealed a pledge at the Aomori Prosecutor's Office to completely withdraw from leftist activities.

Early literary career

Tsushima kept his promise and settled down a bit. He managed to obtain the assistance of established writer Masuji Ibuse, whose connections helped him get his works published and establish his reputation. The next few years were productive for Tsushima. He wrote at a feverish pace and used the pen name "Osamu Dazai" for the first time in a short story called "Ressha" ("列車", "Train") in 1933: His first experiment with the first-person autobiographical style that later became his trademark.

However, in 1935 it started to become clear to Dazai that he would not graduate. He failed to obtain a job at a Tokyo newspaper as well. He finished The Final Years (Bannen), which was intended to be his farewell to the world, and tried to hang himself March 19, 1935, failing yet again. Less than three weeks later, Tsushima developed acute appendicitis and was hospitalized. In the hospital, he became addicted to Pavinal, a morphine-based painkiller. After fighting the addiction for a year, in October 1936 he was taken to a mental institution, locked in a room and forced to quit cold turkey.

The treatment lasted over a month. During this time Tsushima's wife Hatsuyo committed adultery with his best friend Zenshirō Kodate. This eventually came to light, and Tsushima attempted to commit double suicide with his wife. They both took sleeping pills, but neither died. Soon after, Dazai divorced Hatsuyo. He quickly remarried, this time to a middle school teacher named Michiko Ishihara (石原美知子). Their first daughter, Sonoko (園子), was born in June 1941.

In the 1930s and 1940s, Dazai wrote a number of subtle novels and short stories that are autobiographical in nature. His first story, Gyofukuki (魚服記, "Transformation", 1933), is a grim fantasy involving suicide. Other stories written during this period include Dōke no hana (道化の花, "Flowers of Buffoonery", 1935), Gyakkō (逆行, "Losing Ground", 1935), Kyōgen no kami (狂言の神, "The God of Farce", 1936), an epistolary novel called Kyokō no Haru (虚構の春, False Spring, 1936) and those published in his 1936 collection Bannen (Declining Years or The Final Years), which describe his sense of personal isolation and his debauchery.

Wartime years

Japan entered the Pacific War in December, but Tsushima was excused from the draft because of his chronic chest problems, as he was diagnosed with tuberculosis. The censors became more reluctant to accept Dazai's offbeat work, but he managed to publish quite a bit regardless, remaining one of very few authors who managed to get this kind of material accepted in this period. A number of the stories which Dazai published during World War II were retellings of stories by Ihara Saikaku (1642–1693). His wartime works included Udaijin Sanetomo (右大臣実朝, "Minister of the Right Sanetomo", 1943), Tsugaru (1944), Pandora no hako (パンドラの匣, Pandora's Box, 1945–46), and Otogizōshi (お伽草紙, Fairy Tales, 1945) in which he retold a number of old Japanese fairy tales with "vividness and wit."

Dazai's house was burned down twice in the American bombing of Tokyo, but his family escaped unscathed, with a son, Masaki (正樹), born in 1944. His third child, daughter Satoko (里子), who later became a famous writer under the pseudonym Yūko Tsushima (津島佑子), was born in May 1947.

Postwar career

In the immediate postwar period, Dazai reached the height of his popularity. He depicted a dissolute life in postwar Tokyo in Viyon no Tsuma (ヴィヨンの妻, "Villon's Wife", 1947), depicting the wife of a poet who had abandoned her and her continuing will to live through hardships.

In 1946, Osamu Dazai released a controversial literary piece titled Kuno no Nenkan (Almanac of Pain), a political memoir of Dazai himself. It describes the immediate aftermath of losing the second World War, and encapsulates how Japanese people felt following the country's defeat. Dazai reaffirms his loyalty to the Japanese Emperor of the time, Emperor Hirohito and his son Akihito. Dazai was a known communist throughout his career, and also expresses his beliefs through this Almanac of Pain.

Alongside this Dazai also wrote Jugonenkan (For Fifteen Years), another autobiographical piece. This, alongside Almanac of Pain, may serve as a prelude to a consideration of Dazai's postwar fiction.
In July 1947, Dazai's best-known work, Shayo (The Setting Sun, translated 1956) depicting the decline of the Japanese nobility after the war, was published, propelling the already popular writer into celebrityhood. This work was based on the diary of Shizuko Ōta (太田静子), an admirer of Dazai's works who first met him in 1941. She bore him a daughter, Haruko, (治子) in 1947.

A heavy drinker, Dazai became an alcoholic and his health deteriorated rapidly. At this time he met Tomie Yamazaki (山崎富栄), a beautician and war widow who had lost her husband after just ten days of marriage. Dazai effectively abandoned his wife and children and moved in with Tomie.

Dazai began writing his novel No Longer Human (人間失格 Ningen Shikkaku, 1948) at the hot-spring resort Atami. He moved to Ōmiya with Tomie and stayed there until mid-May, finishing his novel. A quasi-autobiography, it depicts a young, self-destructive man seeing himself as disqualified from the human race. The book is considered one of the classics of Japanese literature and has been translated into several foreign languages.

In the spring of 1948, Dazai worked on a novelette scheduled to be serialized in the Asahi Shimbun newspaper, titled Guddo bai (the Japanese pronunciation of the English word "Goodbye") but it was never finished.

Death
On June 13, 1948, Dazai and Tomie drowned themselves in the rain-swollen Tamagawa Canal, near his house. Their bodies were not discovered until six days later, on June 19, which would have been his 39th birthday. His grave is at the temple of Zenrin-ji, in Mitaka, Tokyo.

At the time, there was a lot of speculation about the incident, with theories of forced suicide by Tomie. Keikichi Nakahata, a kimono merchant who frequented the young Tsushima family, was shown the scene of the water ingress by a detective from the Mitaka police station. He also speculates that "Dazai was asked to die, and he simply agreed, but just before his death, he suddenly felt an obsession with life".

Major works

Omoide
"Omoide" is an autobiography where Tsushima created a character named Osamu to use instead of himself to enact his own memories. Furthermore, Tsushima also conveys his perspective and analysis of these situations.

The Flowers of Buffoonery
"The Flowers of Buffoonery" relates the story of Oba Yozo and his time recovering in the hospital from an attempted suicide. Although his friends attempt to cheer him up, their words are fake, and Oba sits in the hospital simply reflecting on his life.

One Hundred Views of Mount Fuji
"One Hundred Views of Mount Fuji" shares Tsushima's experience staying at Misaka. He meets with a man named Ibuse Masuji, a previous mentor, who has arranged an o-miai for Dazai. Dazai meets the woman, Ishihara Michiko, who he later decides to marry.

The Setting Sun
The Setting Sun focuses on a small, formerly rich, family: a widowed mother, a divorced daughter, and a drug-addicted son who has just returned from the army and the war in the South Pacific. After WWII the family has to vacate their Tokyo home and move to the countryside, in Izu, Shizuoka, as the daughter's uncle can no longer support them financially 

No Longer Human
No Longer Human focuses on the main character, Oba Yozo. Oba explains his life from a point in his childhood to somewhere in adulthood. Unable to properly understand how to interact and understand people he resorts to tomfoolery to make friends and hide his misinterpretations of social cues. His façade doesn't fool everyone and doesn't solve every problem. Due to the influence of a classmate named Horiki, he falls into a world of drinking and smoking. He relies on Horiki during his time in college to assist with social situations. With his life spiraling downwards after failing in college, Oba continues his story and conveys his feelings about the people close to him and society in general.

Good-Bye
An editor tries to avoid women with whom he had past sexual relations. Using the help of a female friend he does his best to avoid their advances and hide the unladylike qualities of his friend.

Selected bibliography of English translations
 The Setting Sun (斜陽 Shayō), translated by Donald Keene. Norfolk, Connecticut, James Laughlin, 1956. (Japanese publication: 1947).
 No Longer Human (人間失格 Ningen Shikkaku), translated by Donald Keene. Norfolk, Connecticut, New Directions Publishers, 1958.
 Dazai Osamu, Selected Stories and Sketches, translated by James O’Brien. Ithaca, New York, China-Japan Program, Cornell University, 1983?
 Return to Tsugaru: Travels of a Purple Tramp (津軽), translated by James Westerhoven. New York, Kodansha International Ltd., 1985.
 Run, Melos! and Other Stories. Trans. Ralph F. McCarthy. Tokyo: Kodansha International, 1988. Tokyo: Kodansha English Library, 1988.
 Crackling Mountain and Other Stories, translated by James O’Brien. Rutland, Vermont, Charles E. Tuttle Company, 1989.
 Self Portraits: Tales from the Life of  Japan's Great Decadent Romantic, translated by Ralph F. McCarthy. Tokyo, New York, Kodansha International, Ltd., 1991.
 Blue Bamboo: Tales of Fantasy and Romance, translated by Ralph F. McCarthy. Tokyo and New York, Kodansha International, 1993.
 Schoolgirl (女生徒 Joseito), translated by Allison Markin Powell. New York: One Peace Books, 2011.
 Otogizōshi: The Fairy Tale Book of Dazai Osamu (お伽草紙 Otogizōshi), translated by Ralph F. McCarthy. Fukuoka, Kurodahan Press, 2011.
 Blue Bamboo: Tales by Dazai Osamu (竹青 Chikusei), translated by Ralph F. McCarthy. Fukuoka, Kurodahan Press, 2012.
 A Shameful Life: (Ningen Shikkaku) (人間失格 Ningen Shikkaku), translated by Mark Gibeau. Berkeley, Stone Bridge Press, 2018.
 "Wish Fulfilled" (満願), translated by Reiko Seri and Doc Kane. Kobe, Japan, 2019.

In popular culture
Dazai's literary work No Longer Human has received quite a few adaptations: a graphic novel written by the horror manga artist Junji Ito, a film directed by Genjiro Arato, the first four episodes of the anime series Aoi Bungaku, and a variety of mangas one of which was serialized in Shinchosha's Comic Bunch magazine. It is also the name of an ability in the anime Bungo Stray Dogs and Bungo and Alchemist, used by a character named after Dazai himself.

The book is also the central work in one of the volumes of the Japanese light novel series Book Girl, Book Girl and the Suicidal Mime, although other works of his are also mentioned. Dazai's works are also discussed in the Book Girl manga and anime series. Dazai is often quoted by the male protagonist, Kotaro Azumi, in the anime series Tsuki ga Kirei, as well as by Ken Kaneki in Tokyo Ghoul.

See also
Dazai Osamu Prize
List of Japanese writers
Osamu Dazai Memorial Museum

References

Sources
 O'Brien, James A., ed. Akutagawa and Dazai: Instances of Literary Adaptation. Cornell University Press, 1983.
 Ueda, Makoto. Modern Japanese Writers and the Nature of Literature. Stanford University Press, 1976.
 "Nation and Region in the Work of Dazai Osamu," in Roy Starrs

External links

e-texts of Osamu's works at Aozora bunko

Osamu Dazai's grave
Synopsis of Japanese Short Stories (Otogi Zoshi) at JLPP (Japanese Literature Publishing Project) 

 

1909 births
1948 suicides
20th-century Japanese novelists
Japanese male short story writers
People of the Empire of Japan
Writers from Aomori Prefecture
University of Tokyo alumni
Suicides by drowning in Japan
20th-century Japanese short story writers
20th-century male writers
Joint suicides